was the thirteenth Shikken (1315–1316) of the Kamakura shogunate.

1333 deaths
1286 births
Hōjō clan
People of Kamakura-period Japan